André Barbosa da Silva (born 27 August 2000) is a Swiss professional footballer who plays as a centre-back for SC Freiburg II.

Career statistics

Club

References

2000 births
Living people
Footballers from Zürich
Swiss people of Portuguese descent
Swiss men's footballers
Portuguese footballers
Association football defenders
Switzerland youth international footballers
Portugal youth international footballers
Regionalliga players
3. Liga players
Grasshopper Club Zürich players
SC Freiburg players
SC Freiburg II players
Swiss expatriate footballers
Portuguese expatriate footballers
Swiss expatriate sportspeople in Germany
Portuguese expatriate sportspeople in Germany
Expatriate footballers in Germany